Eow or EOW may refer to:

Auiones, Germanic tribes of the 1st century C.E.
E. O. Wilson (1929–2021), American biologist, theorist, naturalist and author
Electrolysed water, produced by the electrolysis of ordinary tap water containing dissolved sodium chloride
Erik Olin Wright (1947–2019), American sociologist
End of Watch, a 2012 American police film
End of Watch, used in military, security, law enforcement as abbreviation on log-sheets; also used when referring to the date of death of a police officer who was killed in the line of duty.
End of Week, used in banking, finance, or retail, to refer to recurring data-processing activities which happen on a regular basis.  See also EOD, EOM, EOQ, etc.